Voy is a settlement in the Orkney Islands of the north of Scotland. Voy is within the parish of Sandwick.

References

External links 

Canmore - Stromness, Mill of Voy site record

Villages on Mainland, Orkney